No. 96 Squadron was a Royal Air Force squadron. The squadron served on the Western Front during World War II and the Burma Campaign in the South-East Asian Theatre of World War II. No. 96 Squadron served in a variety of roles such as night fighter cover and transportation. It was disbanded in 1959, when its aircraft and personnel became No. 3 Squadron.

History
No. 96 Squadron was formed on 8 October 1917 at Lincolnshire as an aircrew training unit of the Royal Flying Corps, the air force of the British Army during most of World War I. The unit was disbanded on 4 July 1918 but was reformed at St. Ives, Cambridgeshire on 28 September 1918 as a ground attack squadron of the Royal Air Force.

The headquarters of the squadron at that time were located at RAF Wyton. On 11 November 1918 an armistice between the Allies and the German Empire was signed, marking the end of World War I. As a consequence No. 96 Squadron was disbanded by the end of November, 1918 before becoming operational.

World War II
On 18 December 1940 No. 422 Flight, a night fighter unit stationed at RAF Shoreham was renamed to No. 96 Squadron. The commanding officer on reformation was Ronald Gustave Kellett, transferred from the Polish No. 303 Squadron RAF. The squadron's headquarters were located at RAF Cranage in Cheshire. During the war it was commanded by Edward Crew.

Post World War II
In March 1945 the squadron was moved to the Far East. Destined for Egypt, the squadron collected its Dakotas en route in Egypt. The squadron provided parachute and glider training in India whilst also providing detachments for operations in Burma and general transport flights throughout the Far East. In April 1946 96 Squadron moved to Hong Kong where air transport was maintained to Malaya and China before the squadron was renamed No. 110 Squadron on 15 June 1946.

No. 96 Squadron reformed again on 17 November 1952 at RAF Ahlhorn in Germany as part of No. 125 Wing RAF. It moved to RAF Geilenkirchen on 12 February 1958. Equipped with Meteor night fighters the squadron provided fighter cover for Germany until it was renumbered No. 3 Squadron on 21 January 1959, at which point it converted to Gloster Javelins.

Aircraft operated

See also
List of Royal Air Force aircraft squadrons

Notes

References 
 

096
096
Military units and formations disestablished in 1959